Styliola subula is a species of gastropods belonging to the family Creseidae.

The species has almost cosmopolitan distribution.

References

Creseidae